St. Peter's Ward is a 2-seat ward of Kettering Borough Council. The ward was last fought at Borough Council level in the 2007 local council elections, in which both seats were won by the Conservatives.

The current councillors are Cllr. Ian Jelly and Cllr. Paul Marks.

Councillors
Kettering Borough Council Elections 2007
Terry Freer (Conservative)
Mary Malin (Conservative)

Current Ward Boundaries (2007-)

Kettering Borough Council Elections 2007

Kettering Borough Council Elections 2003

(Vote count shown is ward average)

See also
Kettering
Kettering Borough Council

Electoral wards in Kettering